The 1946 New Year Honours were appointments by many of the Commonwealth Realms of King George VI to reward and highlight good works by citizens of those countries, and to celebrate the passing of 1945 and the beginning of 1946. They were announced on 1 January 1946.

As part of the New Year Honours it is customary to award peerages and knighthoods to important public figures who have made a great service to Britain or the British people. The peerages and knighthoods awarded to citizens of the United Kingdom and Commonwealth Realms in 1946 as part of the New Year Honours are listed.

Peerages and Privy Council
Peerages were only awarded in the United Kingdom, and were the peerages of Viscount (higher) and Baron (lower), at the time being promoted to the peerage automatically gave the right to sit in the House of Lords and vote on legislation. Included are appointments to the Privy Council which is a formal body of advisers to the Sovereign of the United Kingdom.

Viscount 
Field-Marshal the Right Honourable Alan Francis, Baron Alanbrooke, Aide-de-Camp General to the King.
Field-Marshal the Honourable Sir Harold Rupert Leofric George Alexander, Aide-de-Camp General to the King.
Admiral of the Fleet the Right Honourable Andrew Browne, Baron Cunningham of Hyndhope, .
Field-Marshal Sir Bernard Law Montgomery, .
Marshal of the Royal Air Force the Right Honourable Charles Frederick Algernon, Baron Portal of Hungerford, .
The Right Honourable Julius Salter, Baron Southwood, Chairman, Odhams Press Ltd. Chairman of the Red Cross Penny-a-Week Committee of HRH The Duke of Gloucester's Fund. For political and public services.

Baron
Admiral Sir Bruce Austin Fraser, .
Marshal of the Royal Air Force Sir Arthur William Tedder, .
Admiral of the Fleet Sir John Cronyn Tovey, First and Principal Naval Aide-de-Camp to the King.
Field-Marshal Sir Henry Maitland Wilson, Aide-de-Camp General to the King.
Colin Frederick Campbell, President of the British Bankers' Association. Chairman of the Committee of the London Clearing Bank, and of the National Provincial Bank, Ltd.
John Percival Davies. For political and public services in Lancashire.
Philip Albert Inman, Chairman, Charing Cross Hospital. For political and public services.

Privy Counsellors
The Honourable John Albert Beasley, Minister for Defence and Acting Attorney-General, Commonwealth of Australia.
Sir Travers (The Honourable Mr. Justice) Humphreys, a Judge of His Majesty's High Court of Justice since 1928.
The Honourable James Lorimer Ilsley, Minister of Finance, Canada.
William Joseph Jordan, High Commissioner for New Zealand in the United Kingdom.
The Honourable Walter Nash, Minister of Finance and Customs, New Zealand.
The Honourable Louis Stephen St. Laurent, Minister of Justice and Attorney-General, Canada.

Knight Bachelor

United Kingdom
Major-General Ralph Bignell Ainsworth, Director of Medical Services, Joint War Organisation of the British Red Cross Society and Order of St. John.
Wallace Alan Akers, Director of Atomic Bomb Research, Department of Scientific and Industrial Research.
Donald Coleman Bailey, Acting Superintendent, Experimental Bridging Establishment, Ministry of Supply.
William Thomas Bailey, President of the Newspaper Society.
William Valentine Ball, Senior Master and King's Remembrancer, Supreme Court of Judicature.
Harold Idris Bell, For services to Classical and Welsh scholarship.
Thomas Penberthy Bennett, lately Director of Works, Ministry of Works.
Captain David William Bone, Commodore Master, Anchor Line Ltd.
Francis Joseph Edwin Brake, Controller of Construction and Regional Services, Ministry of Aircraft Production.
Samuel Harold Brown, Lately Under-Secretary, Ministry of Aircraft Production.
Major-General Kenneth Gray Buchanan, Secretary, Council of Voluntary War Work.
Roland Burrows, . For services to the Home Office.
John James Cater, Chief Inspector of Taxes, Board of Inland Revenue.
Geoffrey Edmund Cator, Malayan Agent in London. For services to the dependents of internees in the Far East.
Robert Christopher Chance, Alderman, Carlisle County Borough.
Captain William Arthur Charlton, Commodore Master, Furness Withy & Co. Ltd.
George Perrin Christopher, Director, Commercial Services, Ministry of War Transport.
Clive Forster-Cooper, Director of the British Museum (Natural History).
John Herbert McCutcheon Craig, Deputy Master and Controller, Royal Mint.
Austin Earl, Principal Assistant Under Secretary of State, War Office.
Lawrence Edwards, lately Deputy Controller of Merchant Shipbuilding and Repairs, Admiralty.
Professor Charles Drummond Ellis, Scientific Adviser to the Army Council.
Hubert Bryan Heath Eves, Chairman, Tanker Tonnage Committee, Petroleum Board. Deputy Chairman, Anglo-Iranian Oil Company.
Harold Arthur Thomas Fairbank, Consultant Adviser in Orthopaedic Surgery, Ministry of Health Emergency Medical Service.
John Robinson Felton, HM Chief Inspector of Mines, Ministry of Fuel and Power.
Arthur Frederic Brownlow fforde, lately Under-Secretary, HM Treasury.
Paul Gordon Fildes, Director of Chemical Bacteriology, Medical Research Council.
Douglas Stuart Gibbon, Chief Taxing Master of the Supreme Court of Judicature.
Charles Frederick Goodeve, Deputy Controller, Research and Development, Admiralty.
John Gibson Graham, lately Chief Representative of the Ministry of War Transport in the Mediterranean.
Archibald Montague Henry Gray, Dermatologist, University College Hospital. For special war services.
William Reginald Halliday, Principal, King's College, London.
Professor Ian Morris Heilbron, lately Scientific Adviser, Ministry of Production.
John Richard Hobhouse, Regional Shipping Representative for North West England, Ministry of War Transport.
Lieutenant-Colonel Herbert Patrick Hunter, Chief Constable of Staffordshire.
Norman Victor Kipping, lately Head of the Regional Division, Ministry of Production.
Cyril Leigh Macrae Langham, Solicitor, Ministry of Labour and National Service.
Eric Cyril Egerton Leadbitter, Clerk in Ordinary of His Majesty's Most Honourable Privy Council.
Herman Andrew Harris Lebus, lately Adviser on utility furniture to the Board of Trade.
Major Robert Leighton, lately President of the British Federation of Master Printers.
Gerald Lenanton, Director, Home Timber Production Department, Ministry of Supply.
Benny Lockspeiser, Director of Scientific Research, Ministry of Aircraft Production.
Arthur Macdonald, Honorary Treasurer, Durham Aged Mineworkers' Association. General Manager, Co-operative Wholesale Society, Ltd, Bankers, Manchester.
William Lennox McNair, Legal Adviser to the Ministry of War Transport.
Colonel Wilfrid Martineau, lately Chairman, Emergency Committee, City of Birmingham.
John Robertson Masson, lately Chief Representative of the Ministry of War Transport in India.
Frank Charles Mears, President of the Royal Scottish Academy.
Francis Meredith Meynell, Adviser on Consumer Needs to the Board of Trade.
Commander Edward Robert Micklem, Royal Navy (Retd.), Deputy Chairman, Vickers-Armstrongs Ltd.
John Mollett, Director of Potatoes and Carrots, Ministry of Food.
Charles Norman Nixon, Governor of the National Bank of Egypt.
Charles Eric Palmer, Chairman, Cake and Biscuit Manufacturers War-time Alliance.
Harold Parkinson, Vice-Chairman, National Savings Committee.
Leonard Cecil Paton, Commercial Managing Director, United Kingdom Commercial Corporation.
Ralegh Buller Phillpotts, Chairman, British Tabulating Machine Company.
William Robinson, lately Chairman of the Administrators for the City of Belfast.
Martin Pearson Roseveare, Senior Chief Inspector, Ministry of Education.
Bertram Thomas Rumble, Honorary Secretary and Treasurer, Appeals Committee, Royal Air Force Benevolent Fund.
David Russell, Chancellor's Assessor, St. Andrew's University.
Edward James Salisbury, Director of the Royal Botanic Gardens, Kew.
Alexander Morris Carr-Saunders, Director of the London School of Economics and Political Science.
William Dalgleish Scott, Permanent Secretary, Ministry of Finance, and official Head of HM Civil Service, Northern Ireland.
James Dyer Simpson, lately Chairman, British Insurance Association.
Frank Ewart Smith, Chief Engineer and Superintendent, Armament Design Department, Ministry of Supply.
Colonel Gilbertson Smith, Chairman, Essex County Council. For services to Civil Defence.
William George Verdon Smith, Chairman, Bristol Aeroplane Co. Ltd.
Thomas George Spencer, Managing Director, Standard Telephones & Cables Ltd.
Alexander Murray Stephen, Chairman, Alexander Stephen & Sons, Shipbuilders and Engineers, Glasgow.
Harold Augustine Tempany, Agricultural Adviser to the Secretary of State for the Colonies.
Percy Edward Thomas, President of the Royal Institute of British Architects.
Lieutenant-Colonel Reginald Aneurin Thomas, HM Chief Inspector of Explosives, Home Office.
Theodore Eastaway Thomas, lately General Manager, London Passenger Transport Board.
Major Robert Norman Thompson, Chairman Joseph L. Thompson & Sons, Ltd, Sunderland. For services to shipbuilding.
John Mackay Thomson, Secretary, Scottish Education Department.
Henry Samuel Edwin Turner, Director of Meat and Livestock, Ministry of Food.
Stanley Unwin, Publisher. Chairman, Books and Periodicals Committee, British Council. For public services.
Charles Geoffrey Vickers, Director-General, Economic Intelligence Division, Foreign Office.
Henry Wade, Senior Visiting Surgeon, Bangour Emergency Hospital, West Lothian.
George Rolande Percival Wall, Deputy Secretary, Ministry of Food.
James Arthur Wilson, Chief Constable of Cardiff. For services to Civil Defence.

Dominions
Ralph Stuart Bond, Chairman of the Finance Committee, The Empire Societies' War Hospitality Committee.
Frederick Lloyd Dumas. For public services in the State of South Australia.
The Honourable Edward Wheewall Holden, a Member of the Legislative Council, State of South Australia. For services to industry.

India
The Honourable Mr. Justice Sidney Wadsworth, Indian Civil Service, Puisne Judge of the High Court of Judicature at Fort St. George, Madras.
The Honourable Mr. Justice Rupendra Coomar Mitter, Puisne Judge of the High Court of Judicature at Fort William in Bengal.
Robert Edwin Russell, Indian Civil Service, Adviser to His Excellency the Governor of Bihar.
Ivon Hope Taunton, Indian Civil Service, Adviser to His Excellency the Governor of Bombay.
Eric Cecil Ansorge, Indian Civil Service, Adviser to His Excellency the Governor of Bihar.
John Sargent, Secretary to the Government of India in the Department of Education.
Major Thomas Faulkner Borwick, Director-General, Ordnance Factories, Munitions Production Branch, Government of India.
Herbert Ray Stewart, Indian Agricultural Service, Vice-Chairman, Imperial Council of Agricultural Research.
Charles Francis Waterfall, Indian Civil Service, lately Chief Commissioner, Andaman and Nicobar Islands.
Major-General Charles Offley Harvey, Military Adviser-in-Chief, Indian States Forces.
George Eustace Cuffe, General Manager, Bombay, Baroda & Central India Railway, and lately Director-General of Railways (Calcutta Area), Calcutta.
Percy William Marsh, Indian Civil Service (Retd.), Chairman, Punjab and North-West Frontier Province Joint Public Service Commission, Lahore, Punjab.
John Thorne Masey Bennett, Indian Police, Inspector-General of Police, Punjab, and Joint Secretary to Government, Home (Police) Department, Punjab.
Clarmont Percival Skrine, Indian Political Service, His Britannic Majesty's Consul-General for Khorasan, Meshed.
Harold George Dennehy, Indian Civil Service, Chief Secretary to the Government of Assam.
Lieutenant-Colonel Alistair John Ransford, Royal Engineers, Mint Master, His Majesty's Mint, Bombay.
Lieutenant-Colonel Desmond Fitz-John Fitzmaurice, Royal Engineers, Master, Security Printing, Government of India.
Percy James Edmunds, Chief Engineer, Posts and Telegraphs, New Delhi.
Lieutenant-Colonel Nilkanth Shriram Jatar, Indian Medical Service (Retd.), Inspector-General of Prisons, Central Provinces and Berar.
John Brownson Greaves, lately member of the Bombay Legislative Assembly, Chairman, Greaves Cotton & Company, Sheriff of Bombay.
Behram Naorosji Karanjia, lately member of the Bombay Legislative. Council, Businessman, Bombay.
Frank Ware, Director of Animal Husbandry, United Provinces.
Major Nawab Muhammad Jamshed Ali Khan, lately member of the United Provinces Legislative Assembly, Zamindar of Baghpat, Meerut District, United Provinces.
Lieutenant-Colonel Sahib Singh Sokhey, Indian Medical Service, Director, Haffkine Institute, Bombay.
Kottaiyur Veerappa Alagappa Ramanatha Alagappa Chettiar, Barrister-at-Law, Banker and Mill-owner, Madras.
Amatyasiromanti Trichinopoly Thumboo Chetty, Private Secretary to His Highness the Maharaja of Mysore.
Nawab Ghaibi Khan (walad Muhammad Khan Chandio), Ghaibidero, Taluka Kambar, Larkana District, Sind.
Sardar Bahadur Indra Singh, Managing Director, Messrs. Indian Steel & Wire Products Limited, Calcutta.
Sardar Surendra Singh Maiithia, Managing Proprietor, Saraya Sugar Factory, Sardar Nagar, Gorkahpur District, United Provinces.

Colonies, Protectorates, Etc.
Albert Ernest De Silva. For public services in Ceylon.
Errol Lionel Dos Santos. Financial Secretary, Trinidad.
Horace Hector Hearne, Colonial Legal Service, Chief Justice, Jamaica.
Lim Han Hoe, . For public services in the Straits Settlements.
Carleton George Langley, Colonial Legal Service, Chief Justice, British Honduras.
Philippe Raffray, . For public services in Mauritius.
Alfred Vincent. For public services in Kenya.

New Year Honours
New Year Honours (Peerages and Knighthoods)